The 2012 LPGA Championship was the 58th LPGA Championship, held June 7–10 at Locust Hill Country Club in Pittsford, New York, a suburb southeast of Rochester. Known for sponsorship reasons as the Wegmans LPGA Championship, it was the second of four major championships on the LPGA Tour during the 2012 season. This was the third of four consecutive years the LPGA Championship was played at Locust Hill.

The champion was Shanshan Feng, who won with a 282 (−6), two strokes ahead of four runners-up: Eun-Hee Ji, Stacy Lewis, Mika Miyazato, and Suzann Pettersen. Following the third round, Feng was tied for seventh and three strokes back. In the final round, she shot a bogey-free 67 (−5), the lowest round of the tournament, to secure her first LPGA Tour victory and move from tenth to fifth in the Women's World Golf Rankings. Her best finish in 16 previous majors was a tie for 22nd.

Course

Field
The field included 150 players from 25 countries, with the cut to the top 70 players and ties after the second round.

Past champions in the field

Made the cut

Missed the cut

Source:

Tournament summary

First round
Thursday, June 7, 2012

Source:

Second round
Friday, June 8, 2012

The cut was at 151 (+7) or better with 73 players advancing to play on the weekend. The cut line was five strokes higher than at the 2011 LPGA Championship.

Source:

Third round
Saturday, June 9, 2012

Source:

Final round
Sunday, June 10, 2012

Source:

Scorecard
Final round

Cumulative tournament scores, relative to par
{|class="wikitable" span = 50 style="font-size:85%;
|-
|style="background: Pink;" width=10|
|Birdie
|style="background: PaleGreen;" width=10|
|Bogey
|style="background: Green;" width=10|
|Double bogey
|}

References

External links

Coverage on LPGA Tour official site
Locust Hill Country Club

Women's PGA Championship
Golf in New York (state)
LPGA Championship
LPGA Championship
LPGA Championship
LPGA Championship